Tominari (written: 冨成) is a Japanese surname. Notable people with the surname include:

, Japanese footballer
, Japanese photographer

See also
13582 Tominari, a main-belt minor planet

Japanese-language surnames